Sanjay Subrahmanyan (born 21 January 1968 in Chennai, Tamil Nadu) is a Carnatic vocalist from India. He was awarded the Madras Music Academy's Sangeetha Kalanidhi in 2015.

Biography
Sanjay Subrahmanyan was born on 21 January 1968 in Chennai to S. Sankaran and Aruna Sankaran (who learned music from Rukmini Rajagopalan, Flute Rajaram Iyer, Maruthuvakudi Rajagopala Iyer and Mayavaram Saraswati). His father S. Sankaran, popularly known as Burma Sankaran, was a member of the drama troupe led by Cho Ramaswamy. He began learning music at age eight, studying the violin with V. Lakshminarayana and vocals from his aunt late Sukanya Swaminathan. He studied 'Carnatic vocal music from Rukmini Rajagopalan for eight years, until 1988, and after 1989 with Calcutta K. S. Krishnamurthi. It is during this phase, which lasted until KSK’s death in 1999, that he started first developing and then mastering an innovative style of singing that blended tradition and modernity, and he set aside his career as an accountant for one in music.
It was during this period that Sanjay Subrahamanyan, along with several of his young contemporaries founded the Youth Association of Carnatic Music (YACM). YACM was created for the purpose of promoting Carnatic music amongst the youth, and provided a platform for young Carnatic musicians to showcase their talents.
He studied with Semponarkoil S. R. D. Vaidyanathan from 2002 until 2013.
In this period, Sanjay Subrahmanyan started to explore vivadi (dissonant) ragas. He sang ragam-tanam-pallavis in Hindusthani ragas. He explored several rare raga-s that are not often sung in concerts.

Awards and titles
2011: The Indira Sivasailam Endowment Medal from the Indira Sivasailam Endowment Fund and Madras Music Academy
2016: Isai Perarignar Award 
2015: Sangeetha Kalanidhi award from the Music Academy, Chennai.
2013: Gaana Padhmam from the Brahma Gana Sabha, Chennai.
2012: GiIMA Award, Best Album in Carnatic Vocal Music
2011: GiIMA Award, Best Album in Carnatic Vocal Music
1986: First prize in the All India Radio music competition

Filmography and discography 
Sanjay Subrahmanyan was the subject of the documentary film "Aaraar aasaippadaar" by filmmaker Prasanna Ramaswamy; the documentary film was screened in November 2006 in Chennai.
His albums are also available for download on iTunes, Amazon, Gumroad and other popular digital distribution portals.

Sanjay Subrahmanyan’s discography is presented below:

References

External links
 Sanjay Subrahmanyan's website

Male Carnatic singers
Carnatic singers
1968 births
Living people
Tamil singers
Musicians from Chennai